Jessica Daves (February 20, 1898 – September 21, 1974) was an American writer and editor. She is best known for serving as editor-in-chief of influential Vogue magazine, from 1952 to 1962.

Biography
Daves was born in Georgia, in 1898, but moved to New York City, in 1921, where she worked in the advertising industry.  She first started to work as an editor, at Vogue in 1933.

She wrote or co-wrote three books: The Vogue Book of Menus, Ready‐Made Miracle: The Story of American Fashion for the Millions and The World in Vogue.  In 2019 fashion historian Rebecca Tuite published an account of her vogue editorship, 1950s in Vogue: The Jessica Daves Years, 1952-1962.

References

1898 births
1974 deaths
American magazine editors
American women journalists
American women writers
Vogue (magazine) editors
Women magazine editors
20th-century American women
20th-century American people